Appunti su un fatto di cronaca is a 1951 Italian documentary film directed by Luchino Visconti.

Cast
 Vasco Pratolini: Narrator (voice)

External links
 

1951 films
1951 documentary films
Italian documentary films
Italian black-and-white films
1950s Italian films